Jáchyme, hoď ho do stroje! is a 1974 Czechoslovak comedy film directed by Oldřich Lipský.

Cast
 Luděk Sobota - František Koudelka
 Marta Vančurová - Blanka
 Věra Ferbasová - František's aunt
 Josef Dvořák - Bedřich Hudeček
 Ladislav Smoljak - Karfík
 Zdeněk Svěrák - Klasek
 Karel Novák - Innkeeper
 Václav Lohniský - Doc. Chocholoušek
 Eva Fiedlerová - Mrs. Nevyjelová
 František Husák - Attendant Arnošt
 Josef Hlinomaz - Attendant Arnošt
 Miroslav Homola - Speaker
 Lubomír Lipský - Gate-keeper
 Petr Nárožný - Car racer Volejník
 Eva Svobodová - František's mother

External links
 

Films about technology
Films directed by Oldřich Lipský
Films with screenplays by Zdeněk Svěrák
Czechoslovak comedy films
1974 comedy films
1974 films
1970s Czech-language films